There are three area codes in the state of Utah as of 2009.

 801: The original area code for the entirety of Utah; established in 1947. As of 2020, it includes the four counties of the Wasatch Front (Salt Lake, Utah, Davis, Weber) and Morgan County.
 435: Split from 801 in 1997, encompassing all other counties in the state.
 385: Split from 801 in 2009, area is synonymous with 801.

References

External links

 
Utah
Area codes